Tomasz Baliga  (born 6 November 1988, in Kraków) is a Polish defender.

Career

Club
In August 2010, he was loaned to Okocimski KS Brzesko on a one-year deal.

References

External links
 

1988 births
Living people
MKS Cracovia (football) players
Polish footballers
Footballers from Kraków
Association football defenders